Long Biên station is a railway station in Hoàn Kiếm District, Hanoi, Vietnam, at the western end of Long Biên Bridge. It is the one of the two main railway stations of Hanoi, the other being the Hanoi central station which mostly serves the north-south route (to Ho Chi Minh City) and the north-west route (to Lao Cai). Long Biên railway station serves destinations to the North and East including Hai Phong and Đồng Đăng.

References

External links

Railway stations in Hanoi